The Miccosukee Indian Reservation is the homeland of the Miccosukee tribe of Native Americans. It is divided into three sections in two counties of southern Florida, United States. Their total land area is 128.256 sq mi (332.183 km2). The Miccosukee Reservation have members living on and off the reservation.

The largest section by far is known as the Alligator Alley Reservation, which is located at the extreme western part of Broward County, at its county line with Collier County. It has a land area of 127.057 sq mi (329.076 km2).

Although this section is much smaller than the Alligator Alley section, it is the center of most tribal operations. It has a land area of 712.64 acres (2.884 km2).

The smallest section is the Krome Avenue Reservation, located east of the Tamiami Trail section and closer to the city of Miami. It is also on the Tamiami Trail, on the northwest corner of its intersection with Krome Avenue (Southwest 177th Avenue), just west of the community of Tamiami.  This section has a land area of only 55.04 acres (0.2227 km2). The Miccosukee Resort & Casino is on this site.

References 
 Miccosukee Reservation, Florida United States Census Bureau
 Miccosukee Resort & Gaming Official site

American Indian reservations in Florida
Populated places in Broward County, Florida
Populated places in Miami-Dade County, Florida
Miccosukee